Sherry Chen (born December 15, 1955) is a South African businesswoman and former member of parliament. Chen immigrated to South Africa in 1981, first working at a textile factory, then as an English secretary for a Taiwanese firm that later went bankrupt. She then did odd jobs for a while before getting a job at a travel agency.

Chen eventually went on to found four highly successful companies involved in a myriad of different commercial activities.  Chen became involved in politics in 1994 through her activities with the Chinese community in South Africa. Due to business commitments, she did not run for office until she successfully ran for a seat on the Johannesburg city council, taking her seat in 2000. In 2004, she was elected as a member of parliament. In September 2010 Chen resigned from her position in parliament to focus more on her business interests and social welfare work.

Awards
 Randburg Business Person of the Year (1994)
 Gauteng Business Person of the Year (1994)
 Top 19 Global Chinese Businesswoman (2011)

References

Living people
1955 births
South African businesspeople
Taiwanese emigrants to South Africa
South African politicians of Chinese descent
Politicians from Taipei
Businesspeople from Taipei
21st-century South African politicians
21st-century South African women politicians